Douglas R. Trottier ( 1971) is a New Hampshire politician.

Early life
Trottier was born around 1971. Trottier has earned a high school diploma, and as of September 2020, is taking law classes online.

Career
Trottier is a retired police officer. He has a 27 year law enforcement career. In 2019, Trottier unsuccessfully ran for the board of selectmen of Belmont, New Hampshire. On September 8, 2020, Trottier won the Republican primary for the New Hampshire House of Representatives alongside Michael Sylvia. On November 3, 2020, Trottier was elected to the New Hampshire House of Representatives where he represents the Belknap 6 district. He assumed office on December 2, 2020.

Personal life
Trottier resides in Belmont, New Hampshire. Trottier is married and has five children.

References

Living people
1970s births
American police officers
Republican Party members of the New Hampshire House of Representatives
People from Belmont, New Hampshire
21st-century American politicians